Johnny Fisher, also known by his nickname The Romford Bull, is a professional boxer from Romford, England.

He played rugby for a number of years as well as boxing, he says the high level physical sport helped give him a good grounding for his boxing career. His father boxed at amateur level and his grandfather also boxed, but only casually. His siblings have also boxed too.

He has been boxing since before his teens, he stopped but only to pick it back up in his second year of university when he began to spar Joe Joyce. He formed a good relationship with him and sparred him in preparation for Joyce's fight against Daniel Dubois. Fisher said that Joyce's "force has brought my strength along too" and that he is the "closest thing he has seen to a real life human wrecking machine".

Amateur boxing career 
He had a brief amateur career of only two bouts, winning both by RSC. His debut was against Milton Vita on 16 November 2018 and his second was against Richard Aston on 14 December of that same year.

Professional boxing career 
He made his professional debut on the 20 February 2021 against Matt Gordon on the undercard for the David Avanesyan vs. Josh Kelly fight at the Wembley Arena. He won by TKO 2:29 into the first round, with his opponent being both counted and knocked down before the stoppage.

His second fight was against Phil Williams, in the Manchester Arena, he won by TKO again, this time referee Howard Foster stopped the contest 1:46 into round three. His third was in the Matchroom HQ Garden against Danny Whitaker, where he once again won by TKO. In his fourth fight he won against Alvaro Terrero by TKO in the second round after he scored two knockdowns. His fifth fight he won on points at Alexandra Palace against Gabriel Enguema, with referee Mark Bates scoring the contest 59–55 over six rounds. His seventh was against Domnic Musil. His style has been likened to David Pearce.

Personal life 
Johnny Fisher has a 2:1 in history from Exeter University, he did his dissertation on the aerial bombing of Germany in 1944–45. His father has become popular on social media site TikTok, and is known for his love of Chinese food.

References

Living people
English male boxers
Heavyweight boxers
Year of birth missing (living people)